Norway was represented by Jahn Teigen and Anita Skorgan, with the song "Adieu", at the 1982 Eurovision Song Contest, which took place on 24 April in Harrogate, England. "Adieu" was chosen as the Norwegian entry at the Melodi Grand Prix on 20 March. This was a second Eurovision appearance for Teigen and a third for Skorgan.

Before Eurovision

Melodi Grand Prix 1982 
The Melodi Grand Prix 1982 was held at the studios of broadcaster NRK in Oslo, hosted by Ivar Dyrhaug. Ten songs took part in the final, with the winner chosen by voting from 11 regional juries.

At Eurovision 
On the night of the final Teigen and Skorgan performed third in the running order, following Luxembourg and preceding the United Kingdom. Clocking in at only 2 minutes 10 seconds, "Adieu" was one of the shortest songs ever in a Eurovision final. At the close of voting "Adieu" had picked up 40 points, placing Norway 12th of the 18 entries. The Norwegian jury awarded its 12 points to Cyprus.

Voting

References

External links 
Full national final on nrk.no

1982
Countries in the Eurovision Song Contest 1982
1982
Eurovision
Eurovision